"Men of Steel" is a song performed by American rappers Shaquille O'Neal, Ice Cube, B-Real, Peter Gunz and KRS-One from the soundtrack to Kenneth Johnson's film Steel. It was released on August 26, 1997 through Qwest Records as the only single from the album. Production was handled by Poke and Tone with Ken Ross serving as executive producer.

The single peaked at number 82 on the Billboard Hot 100, number 53 on the Hot R&B/Hip-Hop Songs, number 10 on the Hot Rap Songs in the US.

Track listing

Personnel
Shaquille O'Neal – vocals
O'Shea Jackson – vocals
Louis Freese – vocals
Peter Pankey – vocals
Lawrence Parker – vocals
Jean-Claude Olivier – producer
Samuel Barnes – producer
Ken Ross – executive producer
Mark D. Persaud – co-executive producer
Ian Alexander – associate executive producer
Jay Brown – associate executive producer
Gregory Gilmer – artwork

Charts

References

External links

1997 songs
1997 singles
KRS-One songs
Ice Cube songs
Qwest Records singles
Shaquille O'Neal songs
Songs written by B-Real
Songs written by KRS-One
Songs written by Ice Cube
Songs written by Shaquille O'Neal
Song recordings produced by Trackmasters